Convolutriloba retrogemma is a reddish-brown flatworm 2 mm in length also commonly known as redbug, red planaria, rust flatworm, or simply red flatworm. It is a marine flatworm that gets energy from its endosymbiotic algae or from the consumption of small invertebrates such as copepods and rotifers. Like some other flatworms, it is known to starve coral of sunlight while searching for food on the corals' surface due to its rapid reproduction.

C. retrogemma, like many other flatworms, contains dangerous toxins to keep it predators away, and, on death, it can release these toxins. This is harmful to nearby life such as coral and fish, and even people if infected fish are consumed.

Reproduction 
Convolutriloba retrogemma reproduce quickly either sexually by laying eggs or asexually by using budding and binary fission, where it splits up and makes a bud that will create a new worm, or by using fragmentation, where it forms new parent organisms from fragments of one original parent organism.

Distribution 
These flatworms are found globally, but originate from Cuba. Due to their reproduction techniques they can be a plague to aquariums and fish tanks, as they are very harmful, unsightly, and difficult to remove without harming other life nearby.

References 

Acoelomorphs
Fauna of the Caribbean
Fauna of Cuba
Fauna of the Dominican Republic
Marine fauna of North America
Animals described in 1988